Hotel Lilie is a traditional inn located in historical center of Sterzing, South Tyrol, Italy, the first written record about it is from 1461.
The hotel worked as an inn since its origin and today it is one of the most beautiful buildings of the Late Middle Ages and is protected by the state as a treasure of fine arts.

See also 
List of oldest companies

References

External links 
Homepage
Location on Google Maps

Hotels in Italy
Restaurants in Italy
Companies established in the 15th century
15th-century establishments in Italy
Hotels established in the 15th century
Buildings and structures in South Tyrol